Brandon Glova (born September 4, 1980), better known by his stage name DJ Bonics, is a hip hop disk jockey for Wiz Khalifa and Ex radio DJ at Go Radio 95.3 in Minneapolis, Minnesota.

Career
DJ Bonics worked for seven years as the mixer and afternoon drive DJ for WKST-FM, a Kiss-FM station in Pittsburgh, Pennsylvania. After leaving WKST-FM in 2010, he became the official DJ for Wiz Khalifa. He has also done solo shows. Previously, he DJ'd in Minneapolis, MN for 95.3 GO Radio.

Personal life
DJ Bonics is a Filipino.
DJ Bonics is a graduate of the University of Pittsburgh, where he was a member of Zeta Beta Tau fraternity. In December 2010, a few days after returning from his first tour with Wiz Khalifa, DJ Bonics had a heart attack caused by a blocked artery. He underwent surgery, quickly recovered, and began performing with Wiz Khalifa again within a week. After the incident, he participated in a benefit to benefit the American Heart Association in Pittsburgh. In addition, he formed the Bonics Heartbeats Foundation to promote healthy living.

References

External links

1980 births
Record producers from Pennsylvania
Club DJs
American hip hop DJs
Living people
Musicians from Pittsburgh
Remixers
University of Pittsburgh alumni
American DJs
Electronic dance music DJs